Shouldham Thorpe is a village and civil parish in the English county of Norfolk.
For the purposes of local government, it falls within the district of King's Lynn and West Norfolk. It contains a church (St Mary the Virgin) also in picture.

The villages name means 'Shouldham's outlying farm/settlement'.
Shouldham meaning  'homestead/village with an obligation'.

Notes 

http://kepn.nottingham.ac.uk/map/place/Norfolk/Shouldham%20Thorpe
http://kepn.nottingham.ac.uk/map/place/Norfolk/Shouldham

External links

Villages in Norfolk
Civil parishes in Norfolk
King's Lynn and West Norfolk